The British Rail Class 201 (or 6S) six-car diesel-electric multiple units (DEMUs) were built in 1957–1958 at Eastleigh and underframes were built at Ashford.

The Southern Region Class 201-207 DEMUs are nicknamed 'Thumpers' due to the noise they made while in motion, owing to the four cylinder engines.

These units were built for the London-Hastings line, with a narrow body profile to accommodate the restricted tunnel loading gauge on that line.

Technical details 
Power car (two per six-car set)

 Introduced: 1957
 Weight: 
 Transmission: Electric, two English Electric type EE507 traction motors rated at  each.
 Driving wheel diameter:  Driving Bogie;  Trailer Bogie
 Coupling code: 'Buck-Eye' Type allowing coupling to any BR(S) 20x,4xx Units
 Train heating: Electric

Fleet details 

Original 6S Units

Departmental Units

Reformations 
Some units were disbanded during the mid 1960s to provide stock for the Class 206 'Tadpole' Units and to reform other 'Hastings Sets' after the Hither Green rail crash. Set 1002 was later reformed to its original formation in 1979, but set 1004 was reformed with only its original power cars and some trailers from sister Class 202 and 203 Hastings Sets. Set 1003 was reformed only for the last few months of Hastings DEMU service after its power cars were used for spares, again with none of its original trailers. Set 1007 also suffered a reformation in 1969 but it remained as a full six coach set until withdrawal in 1986.

Preservation 

Most units were withdrawn and scrapped following electrification of the route in 1986. However, one complete unit, no. 1001, was preserved by Hastings Diesels Ltd., which is based at St Leonards-on-Sea. Vehicle no. 60000 has been named Hastings after the town which it previously worked to. This was mainline operational from the unit's revival in 1996 to 2006, but this motor coach was not prioritised when it needed fitting with Central Door Locking (CDL) & On-Train Monitoring Recorders (OTMR). 60000 also needed an overhaul to its bodywork and because of the costs involved, both financial and manpower, this work has not been carried out yet, which means it is currently in storage at St Leonards Depot. The two mainline certified motor coaches that are currently in use on the Hastings Diesel and are fitted with CDL and OTMR are 60116 Mountfield (certified in 2003) and 60118 Tunbridge Wells (certified in 1996). The unit operates several mainline railtours a year, starting from Hastings and going to various destinations; mainly across the South of England, but sometimes further afield.

Additionally, the unit has been used in some unusual non-passenger workings. In July 2015, a crash-damaged Southeastern Class 375 Electrostar EMU was dragged very slowly at 5 mph by HDL's 2 motor coaches from Canterbury West to Ramsgate Depot using a special Dellner coupling-adapter, having collided into a herd of cattle that had strayed onto the line between Wye and Chilham. In August 2015, the 2 motor coaches spent a week at Thameslink's new depot in Three Bridges shunting some of the new-built Class 700 Desiro City trains.

Hastings Diesels Limited owns thirteen non-mainline certified vehicles which are in various states of readiness. Two of these are part restored trailer 60527 and unrestored motor coach 60001, which formed the motive power for the original unit 1001. They have said that there will be no serious work done to 60001 until work to motor coach 60019 is completed, as this one apparently needs less work done to it, which is cheaper, and returning 60000 Hastings to front line service is also finished. 

One other vehicle survives, the former buffet car 60750, the only survivor of the Hither Green crash. It was taken into BR's Research division as RDB 975386 and heavily modified to test the tilt and suspension systems for the APT-P. Previously under restoration at the Electric Railway Museum, it moved to Shakerstone on the Battlefield Line in 2017.

See also 
 British Rail Classes 201, 202 and 203

References

Further reading

External links 

Hasting Diesels
Preserved Thumpers

201
Diesel electric multiple units
Train-related introductions in 1957